Snegirev or Snegiryov is a Russian male surname, its feminine counterpart is Snegireva or Snegiryova. Notable people with the surname include:

Ivan Snegiryov (1793–1868), Russian ethnographer
Max Snegirev (born 1987), Russian racing driver

Russian-language surnames